1982–1992 may refer to:

 1982–1992 (Europe album), a music compilation album
 1982–1992 (Cassiber album), a music compilation album